Complex fluids are mixtures that have a coexistence between two  phases: solid–liquid (suspensions or solutions of macromolecules such as polymers), solid–gas (granular), liquid–gas (foams) or liquid–liquid (emulsions). They exhibit unusual mechanical responses to applied  stress or  strain due to the geometrical constraints that the phase coexistence imposes.  The mechanical response includes transitions between solid-like and fluid-like behavior as well as fluctuations.  Their mechanical properties can be attributed to characteristics such as high disorder, caging, and clustering on multiple length scales.

Example
Shaving cream is an example of a complex fluid.  Without stress, the foam appears to be a solid: it does not flow and can support (very) light  loads.  However, when adequate stress is applied, shaving cream flows easily like a fluid.  On the level of individual bubbles, the flow is due to rearrangements of small collections of bubbles.  On this scale, the flow is not smooth, but instead consists of fluctuations due to rearrangements of the bubbles and releases of stress.  These fluctuations are similar to the fluctuations that are studied in earthquakes.

Dynamics
The  dynamics of the particles in complex fluids are an area of current research. Energy lost due to friction may be a  nonlinear function of the velocity and normal forces.  The topological inhibition to flow by the crowding of constituent particles is a key element in these systems. Under certain conditions, including high  densities and low temperatures, when externally driven to induce flow, complex fluids are characterized by irregular intervals of solid-like behavior followed by stress relaxations due to particle rearrangements. The dynamics of these systems are highly nonlinear in nature. The increase in stress by an infinitesimal amount or a small displacement of a single particle can result in the difference between an arrested state and fluid-like behavior. 

Although many materials found in nature can fit into the class of complex fluids, very little is well understood about them. Inconsistent and controversial conclusions concerning their material properties still persist. The careful study of these systems may lead to "new physics" and new states of matter. For example, it has been suggested that these systems can jam and a "jamming phase diagram" can be used to consider how these systems can jam and unjam. It is not known whether further research will demonstrate these findings, or whether such a theoretical framework will prove useful. As yet this large body of theoretical work has been poorly supported with experiments.

External links

Stephan Herminghaus' Dynamics of Complex Fluids Department
David Weitz's Soft Condensed Matter Physics Laboratory
Howard Stone's Complex Fluids Group
Physical Chemistry and Soft Matter Group, Wageningen
Bob Behringer's complex fluids page
Hernán Alejandro Makse's complex fluids page
Complex Fluids/Nonlinear Dynamics Laboratory
Francois Graner's complex fluids page
Carnegie Mellon University Center for Complex Fluids Engineering
UCLA Center for Complex Fluids and Interfacial Physics 
Paulo Arratia's Complex Fluids Laboratory at Penn
Complex Fluids & Computational Polymer Physics at ETH Zurich
Ubaldo M. Córdova-Figueroa's Low Reynolds Fluid Mechanics Group at UPRM
Zhengdong Cheng's Soft Condensed Matter Group
New England Complex Fluids (NECF) Workgroup

Fluid dynamics
Non-Newtonian fluids